Ruth Ann Roche (18 February 1917 – 4 May 1983), also credited as R. A. Roche and Rod Roche, was a writer and editor in the Golden Age of Comic Books. She was also the business partner of Jerry Iger.

Life and career
Roche started as a writer at the Eisner-Iger studio, a packager for Fiction House, in 1940. She wrote such features as "Phantom Lady", "Senorita Rio", "Sheena, Queen of the Jungle", "Kaanga", and "Camilla". She also wrote the female-led adventure newspaper strip "Flamingo", drawn by Matt Baker and syndicated by Iger's Universal Phoenix Features Syndicate. In 1944, she created the Kismet, Man of Fate, the first Muslim superhero, published in the comic book Bomber Comics from Elliot Publishing Company. She soon became Iger's associate editor; later they became business partners, and the studio became the Roche-Iger studio. She stayed with the Roche-Iger studio until it ceased operations in 1961.

She later married a man named Schaffer (or possibly "Schaefer"). She died in 1983.

Legacy
Trina Robbins and Catherine Yronwode dedicated their 1985 book, Women in the Comics, to Roche.

Bibliography

Writer
 America In Action (1945) #1
 Bomber Comics (1944) #2
 "Pixie" story
 Classic Comics (1941) #32
 Lorna Doone
 Classics Illustrated (1947) #26, 31-32
 Frankenstein
 The Black Arrow
 Lorna Doone
 Fight Comics (1940) #53
 Haunted Thrills (1952) #11
 Out of the Grave
 Jumbo Comics (1938) #44, 152
 Phantom Lady (1947) #13-23
 Phantom Lady (1954) #5 [1]-4
 The Rider (1957) #3
 Seven Seas Comics (1946) #1-4, 6
 The Ol' Skipper

Editor

 Aggie Mack (1948) #8
 All True Romance (1955) #23-24, 27, 30
 Battle Report (1952) #1-3
 Black Cobra (1954) #6
 Bomber Comics (1944) #3
 Bride's Secrets (1954) #9-10, 19
 Ellery Queen (1949) #2
 Fantastic Comics (1954) #11
 The Fighting Man (1952) #1-8
 The Flame (1954) #5 [1]
 G-I in Battle (1952) #8
 Gunsmoke Trail (1957) #2-3
 Haunted Thrills (1952) #3, 10, 12, 17-18
 Lone Eagle (1954) #4
 The Lone Rider (1951) #3, 11, 15, 18, 20
 Lonely Heart (1955) #12
 Men in Action (1957) #1-2, 6
 Midnight (1957) #1-2, 4
 Phantom Lady (1954) #5 [1]-4
 The Rider (1957) #3
 Samson (1955) #12-14
 Secret Love (1957) #2
 Seven Seas Comics (1946) #1-4
 Spitfire Comics (1944) #132
 Spunky the Smiling Spook (1957) #1
 Strange (1957) #1-6
 Strange Fantasy (1952) #2, 4-7, 9-14
 Super Cat (1957) #1
 Swift Arrow (1954) #1-2
 Today's Brides (1955) #4
 Voodoo (1952) #1-6, 8, 10-15, 17, 19

References

Sources 
Robbins, Trina and Catherine Yronwode, Women in the Comics, Eclipse Books, 1985.
Ruth Roche at the Grand Comics Database.

1917 births
1983 deaths
Female comics writers
Golden Age comics creators
20th-century American women writers
20th-century American writers
American comics writers